Arthur George Heron Southern (26 March 1883 – 5 June 1940) was a British gymnast who competed in the 1912 Summer Olympics. He was part of the British team, which won the bronze medal in the gymnastics men's team, European system event in 1912.

References

External links
profile at databaseOlympics
profile at Sports Reference

1883 births
1940 deaths
British male artistic gymnasts
Gymnasts at the 1912 Summer Olympics
Olympic gymnasts of Great Britain
Olympic bronze medallists for Great Britain
Olympic medalists in gymnastics
Medalists at the 1912 Summer Olympics